Albert C.J. Luo (born 1964) is a distinguished research professor of mechanical engineering at Southern Illinois University, Edwardsville, IL, USA.  Luo is an international recognized scientist in the field of nonlinear dynamics and mechanics.  His principal research interests lie in the field of Hamiltonian chaos, nonlinear mechanics, and discontinuous dynamical systems.

Biography 
Luo received his B.S. in mechanical engineering (1984), M.S. in engineering mechanics (1990) in China, and Ph.D. in applied mechanics (1996) in Canada. During 1996-1998, he was an NSERC (National Science and Engineering Research Council of Canada) post-doctoral fellow at UC Berkeley.

Career 
Since 1998, Luo has worked at Southern Illinois University Edwardsville as an assistant/associate/full/distinguished research professor.

Dr Luo systematically developed stability and bifurcation theory in nonlinear dynamical systems, and he also developed discontinuous dynamical systems for many applications in science and engineering., and he developed an analytical technique that is more effective to achieve periodic motions to chaos analytically. Since the 18th century, one has extensively used techniques such as perturbation methods to obtain approximate analytical solutions of periodic motions in nonlinear systems. Toward analytical chaos in nonlinear systems systematically presents an approach to determine periodic flows to chaos or quasi-periodic flows in nonlinear dynamical systems with/without time-delay. The analytical techniques presented provides a better understanding of regularity and complexity of periodic motions and chaos in nonlinear dynamical systems. Dr Luo developed a dynamical system synchronization theory based on the local singularity theory of discontinuous dynamical systems. Techniques can be implemented for engineering applications.

His major contributions on nonlinear dynamical systems are:

 A theory for stochastic and resonant layers in nonlinear Hamiltonian systems
 A local theory and singularity for discontinuous dynamical systems
 Flow barriers theory for discontinuous dynamical systems
 Synchronization of continuous dynamical systems under specific constraints
 Synchronization and companion of discrete dynamical systems
 Analytical solutions of periodic motions in nonlinear systems
 Discretization and implicit mapping dynamics in nonlinear dynamical systems
 Periodic flows in time-delay systems
 Memorized nonlinear dynamical systems

In addition, Luo developed accurate theories for nonlinear deformable-body dynamics, machine tool dynamics and others:
 
 An approximate plate theory
 A theory for soft structures
 A nonlinear theory for beams and rods
 Fluid-induced nonlinear structural vibration
 A large damage theory for anisotropic materials
 A generalized fractal theory

He has published over 350 peer-reviewed journal and conference papers.  Luo has been an editor for the Journal Communications in Nonlinear Science and Numerical simulation, and the book series on Nonlinear Systems and Complexity (Springer), and Nonlinear Physical Science (Higher Education Press).

Luo developed the Dynamics Vibration Testing Laboratory which is one of largest vibration testing laboratories in North America.

Monographs 

Albert C. J. Luo, Bifurcation and Stability in Nonlinear Dynamical Systems (Nonlinear Systems and Complexity), Springer (2020).
Albert C. J. Luo, Resonance and Bifurcation to Chaos in Pendulum (Nonlinear Physical Science), World Scientific (2017).
Albert C. J. Luo, Bo Yu, Galloping Instability to Chaos of Cables (Nonlinear Physical Science), Springer (2017).
Albert C. J. Luo, Periodic Flows to Chaos in Time-delay Systems (Nonlinear Systems and Complexity), Springer (2016).
Albert C. J. Luo, Memorized Discrete Systems and Time-delay (Nonlinear Systems and Complexity), Springer (2016).
Albert C. J. Luo, Discretization and Implicit Mapping Dynamics (Nonlinear Physical Science), Springer (2015).
Albert C. J. Luo, Dennis M. O'Connor, System Dynamics with Interaction Discontinuity (Nonlinear Systems and Complexity), Springer (2015).
Albert C. J. Luo, Toward Analytical Chaos in Nonlinear Systems, Wiley (2014).
Albert C. J. Luo, Analytical Routes to Chaos in Nonlinear Engineering, Wiley (2014).
Albert C. J. Luo, Yu Guo, Vibro-impact Dynamics, Wiley (2013).
Albert C. J. Luo, Dynamical System Synchronization (Nonlinear Systems and Complexity), Springer (2013).
Albert C. J. Luo, Regularity and Complexity in Dynamical Systems (Nonlinear Systems and Complexity), Springer (2012).
Albert C. J. Luo, Continuous Dynamical Systems (Mathematical Methods and Modeling), L & H Scientific Publishing-HEP (2012).
Albert C. J. Luo, Discrete and Switching  Dynamical Systems (Mathematical Methods and Modeling), L & H Scientific Publishing-HEP (2012).
Albert C. J. Luo, Discontinuous Dynamical Systems, Springer (2012).
Brandon C. Gegg, C. Steve Suh, Albert C.J. Luo Machine Tool Vibrations and Cutting Dynamics, Springer (2011).
Albert C. J. Luo, Nonlinear Deformable-body Dynamics (Nonlinear Physical Science), Springer (2010).
Albert C. J. Luo, Discontinuous Dynamical Systems on Time-varying Domains (Nonlinear Physical Science), Springer (2009).
Albert C. J. Luo, Global Transversality, Resonance and Chaotic Dynamics, World Scientific(2008).
Albert C. J. Luo, Singularity and Dynamics on Discontinuous Vector Fields, Elsevier Science (2006).

References

External links
 Albert C J Luo
 Dynamics Vibration Testing

Living people
1964 births
Southern Illinois University Edwardsville faculty
University of Manitoba alumni